The following lists events that happened during the year 2012 in Bosnia and Herzegovina.

Incumbents
Presidency:
Bakir Izetbegović
Željko Komšić
Nebojša Radmanović
Prime Minister: Nikola Špirić (until January 12), Vjekoslav Bevanda (starting January 12)

Events

January
 January 22 - Police in Bosnia and Herzegovina recapture Bosnian Serb fugitive Radovan Stanković after he escaped from prison five years ago.

February
 February 5 - Bosnia and Herzegovina declares a state of emergency as a result of the cold snap.

July
 July 11 - 520 men and boys killed in the Srebrenica massacre in 1995 are buried in Potočari.

September
 September 12 - Police in Bosnia and Herzegovina arrest 25 people on suspicion of multiple murders, drug-trafficking and robbery in the biggest crackdown on organised crime since the Bosnian War.

December
 December 13 - Former Bosnian intelligence chief Zdravko Tolimir, believed to be a top aide to Ratko Mladić, is sentenced to life imprisonment by ICTY for his role in the Srebrenica massacre.

References

 
Years of the 21st century in Bosnia and Herzegovina
2010s in Bosnia and Herzegovina
Bosnia and Herzegovina
Bosnia and Herzegovina